Unless otherwise noted, statements in this article refer to Standard Finnish, which is based on the dialect spoken in the former Häme Province in central south Finland. Standard Finnish is used by professional speakers, such as reporters and news presenters on television.

Vowels

 The close vowels  are similar to the corresponding cardinal vowels .
 The mid vowels are phonetically mid .
 The open front unrounded vowel  is phonetically near-open .
 The unrounded open vowel transcribed in IPA with  has been variously described as near-open back  and open central .

Finnish has a phonological contrast between single and doubled vowels. Phonetically the doubled vowels are single continuous sounds where the extra duration of the hold phase of the vowel signals that they count as two successive vowel phonemes rather than one. The doubled mid vowels are more common in unstressed syllables.

Diphthongs
The table below lists the conventionally recognized diphthongs in Finnish. In speech (i.e. phonetically speaking) a diphthong does not sound like a sequence of two different vowels; instead, the sound of the first vowel gradually glides into the sound of the second one with full vocalization lasting through the whole sound. That is to say, the two portions of the diphthong are not broken by a pause or stress pattern. In Finnish, diphthongs are considered phonemic units, contrasting with both doubled vowels and with single vowels. Phonologically, however, Finnish diphthongs usually are analyzed as sequences (this in contrast to languages like English, where the diphthongs are best analyzed as independent phonemes).

Diphthongs ending in  can occur in any syllable, but those ending in rounded vowels usually occur only in initial syllables, and rising diphthongs are confined to that syllable. It is usually taught that diphthongization occurs only with the combinations listed. However, there are recognized situations in which other vowel pairs diphthongize.

'darkness' from  'dark' +  '-ness' and  'to tidy up oneself' from  'tidy' +  (a kind of middle voice) +  (infinitive suffix).

Opening diphthongs are in standard Finnish only found in root-initial syllables like in words  'to know',  'rear wheel' (from  'back, rear' +  'wheel'; the latter part is secondarily stressed) or  'towards'. This might make them easier to pronounce as true opening diphthongs  (in some accents even wider opening ) and not as centering diphthongs , which are more common in the world's languages. The opening diphthongs come from earlier doubled mid vowels: . Since that time new doubled mid vowels have come to the language from various sources.

Among the phonological processes operating in Finnish dialects are diphthongization and diphthong reduction. For example, Savo Finnish has the phonemic contrast of  vs.  vs.  instead of standard language contrast of  vs.  vs. .

Vowel harmony

Finnish, like many other Uralic languages, has the phenomenon called vowel harmony, which restricts the cooccurrence in a word of vowels belonging to different articulatory subgroups. Vowels within a word "harmonize" to be either all front or all back. In particular, no native noncompound word can contain vowels from the group {a, o, u} together with vowels from the group {ä, ö, y}. Vowel harmony affects inflectional suffixes and derivational suffixes, which have two forms, one for use with back vowels, and the other with front vowels.

There are exceptions to the constraint of vowel harmony. In words containing only neutral vowels, front vowel harmony is used, e.g.  –  ('road' – 'on the road'). For another, compound words do not have vowel harmony across the compound boundary; e.g. In the case of compound words, the choice between back and front suffix alternants is determined by the immediately-preceding element of the compound; e.g.

A particular exception appears in a standard Finnish word,  ('this kind of').

Consonants

  may sometimes be closer to a flap or tap  than a true plosive , and the dialectal realization varies widely; it is increasingly common to pronounce it as a true plosive, however. See the section below. In native vocabulary it is the equivalent of  under weakening consonant gradation, and thus it occurs only word-medially, either by itself (e.g. 'rain'; cf. 'to rain') or in the cluster  (e.g. 'fountain, spring, source'; cf. 'to depart'). In recent loanwords and technical vocabulary the sound can occur somewhat freely (e.g. 'idiot',  'condition').
  is frequently retracted alveolar .
 A glottal stop can appear at certain morpheme boundaries, the same ones as the gemination described further down as a result of certain sandhi phenomena, and it is not normally indicated in spelling at the end of a word: e.g. 'let it be', orthographically . Moreover, this sound is not used in all dialects. 'scales' →  'scales (nom.pl.)'.
 The velar nasal  is also heavily limited in occurrence in native vocabulary: it is found only word-medially, either in the consonant cluster  (written ), or as geminate  (written ), the latter being the counterpart of the former under consonant gradation (type of lenition). In recent loanwords  may also occur in other environments; e.g.  ,  .
 "is often accompanied by a somewhat ballistic lower-lip gesture, producing something like a labiodental flap."
 doesn't appear in native words, but is reliably distinguished by Finnish speakers. Other foreign fricatives are not.  or   appears only in non-native words, sometimes pronounced , although most speakers make a distinction between e.g. 'chess' and  'a gang (of people)'. For example,  and  may be pronounced  and  without fear of confusion. The letter , found mostly in foreign words and names such as Zulu, may also be pronounced as  following the influence of German, thus  .
The phoneme  has glottal and fricative allophones. In general, at the end of a syllable it is pronounced as a fricative whose place of articulation is similar to the preceding vowel: velar  after a back vowel, palatal  after a high front vowel. Between vowels a breathy or murmured  can occur:
  ,  

Voiced plosives

However, these borrowings being relatively common, they are nowadays considered part of the educated norm. Even many educated speakers, however, still make no distinction between voiced and voiceless plosives in regular speech if there is no fear of confusion. Minimal pairs do exist:  'a bus' vs.  'a bag',  'a gorilla' vs.  'on a basket'.

Its realization as a plosive originated as a spelling pronunciation, in part because when mass elementary education was instituted in Finland, the spelling  in Finnish texts was mispronounced as a plosive, under the influence of how Swedish speakers would pronounce this letter. (In the close to seven centuries during which Finland was under first Swedish, then Russian rule, Swedish speakers dominated the government and economy.) Initially, few native speakers of Finnish acquired the foreign plosive realisation of the native phoneme. Due to diffusion of the standard language through mass media and basic education, and due to the dialectal prestige of the capital area, the plosive  can now be heard in all parts of the country, at least in loanwords and in formal speech.

Consonant gradation

"Consonant gradation" is the term used for a set of alternations which pervade the language, between a "strong grade" and a "weak grade". These alternations are always conditioned by both phonology and morphosyntax. The phonological factor which triggers the weak grade is the syllable structure of closed syllable. However, there are contexts where weak grade fails to occur in a closed syllable, and there are contexts where the weak grade occurs in an open syllable. Morphosyntactically, the weak grade occurs in nominals (nouns, pronouns, adjectives) usually only before case suffixes, and in verbs usually only before person agreement suffixes.

The following is a general list of strong–weak correspondences.

{| class="wikitable"
! Strong !! Weak
|-
|  || 
|-
|  || 
|-
|  || 
|-
|  || 
|}

Other consonant alternations
In modern Finnish the alternation is not productive, due to new cases of the sequence  having been introduced by later sound changes and loanwords, and assibilation therefore occurs only in certain morphologically defined positions.

Words having this particular alternation are still subject to consonant gradation in forms that lack assibilation. Thus Finnish nouns of this type could be seen as having up to five distinct stems: a word such as  'water (sg. nom.)' has the forms  (sg. gen.),  (sg. part.),  (sg. ill.) When a vowel other than  occurs, words like  inflect just like other nouns with a single  alternating with the consonant gradated . Alternatively, Kiparsky proposes that all Finnish stems must end in a vowel, which in the case of polysyllabic stems may then be deleted when adding certain affixes and certain other conditions are fulfilled. For  he proposes the stem /vete/ (with stem final -e), which when combined with the partitive singular affix -tä/-ta drops the -e to become  (sg. part.).

This pattern has, however, been reverted in some cases. Variation appears in particular in past tense verb forms, e.g. ,  ('to deny', 'denied') but ,  ('to adjust', 'adjusted'). Both alternate forms ( and ) can also be found in dialects.

The orthography generally favors the single form, if it exists.

Length
All phonemes except  and  can occur doubled phonemically as a phonetic increase in length. Consonant doubling always occurs at the boundary of a syllable in accordance with the rules of Finnish syllable structure.

Some example sets of words:
  'fire'/'s/he came',  'wind',  'customs'
  'mud',  'other' (partitive sg.),  'but',  'to change' or 'to move'

A double  is rare in standard Finnish, but possible, e.g. , a derogatory term for a religious fanatic. In some dialects, e.g. Savo, it is common: , or standard Finnish  'money' (in the partitive case). While  and  may appear as geminates when spoken (e.g.), this distinction is not phonemic, and is not indicated in spelling.

Phonotactics
The phonemic template of a syllable in Finnish is CVC, in which C can be an obstruent or a liquid consonant. V can be realized as a doubled vowel or a diphthong. A final consonant of a Finnish word, though not a syllable, must be a coronal one.

Originally Finnish syllables could not start with two consonants but many loans containing these have added this to the inventory. This is observable in older loans such as  < Swedish  ('French') contrasting newer loans  < Swedish  ('president'). In past decades, it was common to hear these clusters simplified in speech, particularly, though not exclusively, by either rural Finns or Finns who knew little or no Swedish or English. Even then, the Southwestern dialects formed an exception: consonant clusters, especially those with plosives, trills or nasals, are common: examples include place names  and  near the town Pori, or town  ('Kristinestad'). Nowadays the overwhelming majority of Finns have adopted initial consonant clusters in their speech.

Consonant phonotactics
Consonant phonotactics are as follows.

Word-final consonants
 Only .

Word-initial consonants

Word-initial consonant clusters
 No consonant clusters in native words, various consonant clusters in modern loanwords (e.g.  = 'clinic',  = 'psychology',  = 'statistics',  = 'strategy').

Word-final consonant clusters
 None, except in dialects via vowel dropping.

Word-medial consonant clusters
 The following clusters are not possible:
 any exceeding 3 consonants (except in loan words)
 stop + nasal
 labial stop + non-labial stop
 non-dental stop + semivowel
 nasal + non-homorganic obstruent (except )
 nasal + sonorant
 liquid + liquid
 semivowel + consonant

Vowel phonotactics
Vowel phonotactics are as follows.

Word-final and word-initial vowels
 Any of the vowels can be found in this position.

Vowel sequences
 Doubled vowels
 Usually only the vowels  are doubled.
 Sometimes the mid vowels  can be doubled in cases of contraction.
 Diphthongs
 Of the 18 diphthongs, 15 are formed from any vowel followed by a close vowel.
 Vowel combinations
 Approximately 20 combinations, always at syllable boundaries.
 Sometimes 3–4 vowels can occur in a sequence if a medial consonant has disappeared.

Prosody

Stress
Stress in Finnish is non-phonemic. Like Hungarian and Icelandic, Finnish always places the primary stress on the first syllable of a word. Secondary stress normally falls on odd-numbered syllables. Contrary to primary stress, Finnish secondary stress is quantity sensitive. Thus, if secondary stress would normally fall on a light (CV.) syllable but this is followed by a heavy syllable (CVV. or CVC.), the secondary stress moves one syllable further  ("to the right") and the preceding foot (syllable group) therefore contains three syllables. Thus,  ("as my apple") contains light syllables only and has primary stress on the first syllable and secondary on the third, as expected: ómenànani. On the other hand,  ('as our apple') has a light third syllable and a heavy fourth syllable, so secondary stress falls on the fourth syllable: ómenanàmme.

Certain Finnish dialects also have quantity-sensitive main stress pattern, but instead of moving the initial stress, they geminate the consonant, so that e.g. light-heavy CV.CVV becomes heavy-heavy CVCCVV, e.g. the partitive form of "fish" is pronounced  in the quantity-insensitive dialects but  in the quantity-sensitive ones (cf. also the examples under the "Length" section).

Timing
Finnish is not really isochronic at any level. Additionally, acoustic measurements show that the first syllable of a word is longer in duration than other syllables, in addition to its phonological doubling.

Sandhi

Finnish sandhi is extremely frequent, appearing between many words and morphemes, in formal standard language and in everyday spoken language. In most registers, it is never written down; only dialectal transcriptions preserve it, the rest settling for a morphemic notation. There are two processes. The first is simple assimilation with respect to place of articulation (e.g.  > ). The second is predictive gemination of initial consonants on morpheme boundaries.

Simple phonetic incomplete assimilations include:
 , velarization due to 'k', e.g.  
 , labialization due to 'p' e.g.  
 , dissimilation of a sequence of individual vowels (compared to diphthongs) by adding a glottal stop, e.g.   (not obligatory)

Gemination of a morpheme-initial consonant occurs when the morpheme preceding it ends in a vowel and belongs to one of certain morphological classes. Gemination or a tendency of a morpheme to cause gemination is sometimes indicated with an apostrophe or a superscripted "x", e.g.  . Examples of gemination:
 e.g.   ('open-box bed for wood chips')
 imperatives and connegative imperatives of the second-person singular, as well as the connegative form of the present indicative (these three are always similar to each other)
 e.g.   ('buy a boat') 
 connegative imperatives of the third-person singular, first-person plural, second-person plural, third-person plural and passive
   ('actually, don't do it')
 connegative forms of present passive indicative verbs
   ('it will not be taken after all', colloquially 'we won't take it after all')
 connegative forms of present potential verbs (including passive)
   ('I probably will not do it (after all)', formal or poetic speech)
 first infinitives (the dictionary form)
 e.g.  
 noun cases in : allative  as well as the more marginal sublative  (as in ) and prolative  (as in ) and (only for some speakers) the comitative for adjectives, when it is not followed by a possessive suffix
 the possessive suffix of the third person /

The gemination can occur between morphemes of a single word as in  +  →  ('to me too'; orthographically ), between parts of a compound word as in  +  →  ('family meeting'; orthographically ), or between separate words as in  +  →  ('come here!'). In casual speech, this is however often rendered as  without a glottal stop.

These rules are generally valid for the standard language, although many Southwestern dialects, for instance, do not recognise the phenomenon at all. Both forms occur and neither one of them is standardised, since in any case it does not affect writing.

Historically, morpheme-boundary gemination is the result of regressive assimilation. For instance, the modern Finnish word for 'boat'  used to be  (a form still existing in the closely related Karelian language). At some point in time, these  and s were assimilated by the initial consonant of a following word, e.g. ' ('the boat is moving'). Here we get the modern Finnish form  (orthographically ), even though the independent form  has no sign of the old final consonant .

In many Finnish dialects, including that of Helsinki, the gemination at morpheme boundaries has become more widespread due to the loss of additional final consonants, which appear only as gemination of the following consonant, cf. French liaison. For example, the standard word for 'now'  has lost its  and become  in Helsinki speech. However,  +  ('now it [does something]') is pronounced  and not  (although the latter would be permissible in the dialect of Turku).

Similar remnants of a lost word-final  can be seen in dialects, where e.g. the genitive form of the first singular pronoun is regularly  (standard language ):  +  +  →  ('it is mine'). Preceding a vowel, however, the  however appears in a different form:  +  →  or even  ('my own').

See also
 Finnish orthography

Notes

References

Works cited

 
 
 
 
 
 
 

Finnish language
Uralic phonologies